Definition:

The people who are most badly affected when the economy is bad, because they are not rich but are not poor enough to receive money from the government

Squeezed may refer to:

 Squeezed (film), a 2007 Australian documentary
 Squeezed (EP), an EP by What Is This?
 Squeezed, an album by Orange Range
 Compression (physical)

See also 
 Squeezed coherent state, in physics, a state of the quantum mechanical Hilbert space
 Squeeze (disambiguation)